Iron Nation is an extinct town in Lyman County, in the U.S. state of South Dakota.

History
A post office called Iron Nation was established in 1923, and remained in operation until 1938. The town had the name of Iron Nation, a Brulé Lakota chief.

References

Ghost towns in South Dakota
Geography of Lyman County, South Dakota